is a Japanese freestyle skier. She won the Olympic title in the moguls event at the 1998 Winter Olympics, and she finished third at the 2002 games.

Satoya became the first Japanese woman to earn a gold medal in the Winter Olympics.

She was banned by the Ski Association of Japan from participating in the 2005 Freestyle World Ski Championships in Finland.  

Although reportedly suffering from back problems, Satoya competed in the 2010 Winter Olympics in Ladies' Moguls where she finished 19th after falling on her last jump.

References

External links
 Official website

1976 births
Living people
Japanese female freestyle skiers
Sportspeople from Sapporo
Olympic freestyle skiers of Japan
Freestyle skiers at the 1994 Winter Olympics
Freestyle skiers at the 1998 Winter Olympics
Freestyle skiers at the 2002 Winter Olympics
Freestyle skiers at the 2006 Winter Olympics
Freestyle skiers at the 2010 Winter Olympics
Olympic gold medalists for Japan
Olympic bronze medalists for Japan
Olympic medalists in freestyle skiing
Medalists at the 2002 Winter Olympics
Medalists at the 1998 Winter Olympics
Freestyle skiers at the 2003 Asian Winter Games
Freestyle skiers at the 2011 Asian Winter Games
21st-century Japanese women